Jay Cross (born 15 February 1953) is a Canadian sailor. He competed in the 470 event at the 1976 Summer Olympics.

References

External links
 

1953 births
Living people
Canadian male sailors (sport)
Olympic sailors of Canada
Sailors at the 1976 Summer Olympics – 470
Sportspeople from Toronto